The 2019-20 New Hampshire Wildcats Men's ice hockey season was the 94th season of play for the program and the 36th season in the Hockey East conference. The Wildcats represented the University of New Hampshire and were coached by Mike Souza, in his 2nd season.

Roster
As of June 28, 2019.

Standings

Schedule and results

|-
!colspan=12 style=";" | Exhibition

|-
!colspan=12 style=";" | Regular Season

|-
!colspan=12 style=";" |

Scoring statistics

Goaltending statistics

Rankings

Players drafted into the NHL

2020 NHL Entry Draft

† incoming freshman

References

New Hampshire Wildcats men's ice hockey seasons
New Hampshire Wildcats 
New Hampshire Wildcats 
2019 in sports in New Hampshire
2020 in sports in New Hampshire